December 13 - Eastern Orthodox liturgical calendar - December 15

All fixed commemorations below celebrated on December 27 by Eastern Orthodox Churches on the Old Calendar.

For December 14th, Orthodox Churches on the Old Calendar commemorate the Saints listed on December 1.

Saints
 Martyrs Thyrsus, Leucius, and Callinicus (Coronatus), with others, of Bithynia (c. 250).
 Martyrs Apollonius, Philemon, Arianus, Theoctychus, and four guards converted by St. Arianus, at Alexandria (c. 305).
 Martyr Hypatius, and 36 martyrs with him, from the Thebaid in Egypt.

Pre-Schism Western saints
 Martyrs Justus and Abundius (283)
 Saint Pompeius of Pavia, Bishop of Pavia in Italy (c. 290)
 Saint Matronian, born in Milan, he became a hermit; his relics were enshrined by St. Ambrose.
 Saint Viator of Bergamo, an early Bishop of Bergamo in Italy from 344 to 378 (378).
 Hieromartyr Nicasius of Rheims, Bishop of Rheims in France, with his sister Eutropia and Companions (407)
 Saints Fingar (Gwinear) and Phiala, brother and sister, and Companions, martyrs in Cornwall (5th century)
 Saint Agnellus, a hermit and then Abbot of San Gaudioso near Naples in Italy (c. 596).
 Saint Venantius Fortunatus, Bishop of Poitiers (c. 609)
 Saint Hibald (Hygbald), an abbot in Lincolnshire in England to whom several churches are dedicated, notably at Hibaldstow (c. 690)
 Saint Folcwin, Bishop of Thérouanne (855)

Post-Schism Orthodox saints
 Saint Hilarion, Metropolitan of Suzdal and Yuriev (1707).

New martyrs and confessors
 New Hieromartyr Nicholas Kovalev, Priest of Alma-Ata (1937).
 New Hiero-Confessor Bassian (Pyatnitsky), Archbishop of Tambov (1940)

Other commemorations
 Commemoration of the Constantinople earthquake of 557.
 Repose of Blessed Recluse John of Sezenovo Convent (1839).

Icon gallery

Notes

References

Sources
 December 14/27. Orthodox Calendar (PRAVOSLAVIE.RU).
 December 27 / December 14. HOLY TRINITY RUSSIAN ORTHODOX CHURCH (A parish of the Patriarchate of Moscow).
 December 14. OCA - The Lives of the Saints.
 The Autonomous Orthodox Metropolia of Western Europe and the Americas (ROCOR). St. Hilarion Calendar of Saints for the year of our Lord 2004. St. Hilarion Press (Austin, TX). p. 93.
 December 14. Latin Saints of the Orthodox Patriarchate of Rome.
 The Roman Martyrology. Transl. by the Archbishop of Baltimore. Last Edition, According to the Copy Printed at Rome in 1914. Revised Edition, with the Imprimatur of His Eminence Cardinal Gibbons. Baltimore: John Murphy Company, 1916.
Greek Sources
 Great Synaxaristes:  14 ΔΕΚΕΜΒΡΙΟΥ. ΜΕΓΑΣ ΣΥΝΑΞΑΡΙΣΤΗΣ.
  Συναξαριστής. 14 Δεκεμβρίου. ECCLESIA.GR. (H ΕΚΚΛΗΣΙΑ ΤΗΣ ΕΛΛΑΔΟΣ). 
Russian Sources
  27 декабря (14 декабря). Православная Энциклопедия под редакцией Патриарха Московского и всея Руси Кирилла (электронная версия). (Orthodox Encyclopedia - Pravenc.ru).
  14 декабря (ст.ст.) 27 декабря 2013 (нов. ст.). Русская Православная Церковь Отдел внешних церковных связей. (DECR).

December in the Eastern Orthodox calendar